First State Bank is a state chartered community bank that has seven locations throughout Nebraska, with its headquarters located in Gothenburg. Other branches are located in Mullen, North Platte, Omaha, Ralston, and Wallace. As of December 31, 2016, First State Bank was sitting at $450 million in assets.

First State Bank was established in Gothenburg during 1906.

Bank locations:
 914 Lake Avenue, Gothenburg NE 69138
 605 10th Street, Gothenburg NE 69138
 101 NW 1st Street, Mullen NE 69152
 410 Rodeo Road, North Platte NE 69101
 5370 S 72nd Street, Ralston NE 68127
 11808 W Center Road, Omaha NE 68144
 234 S Commercial Avenue, Wallace NE 69169

First State Bank companies: 
 American Mortgage Company 
 American Agency 
 Wallace Agency 
 First State Bank Mortgage

References

Banks based in Nebraska
Privately held companies based in Nebraska
Banks established in 1906
1906 establishments in Nebraska